Augustinian Calvinism is a term used to emphasize the origin of John Calvin's theology within Augustine of Hippo's theology over a thousand years earlier. By his own admission, John Calvin's theology was deeply influenced by Augustine of Hippo, the fourth-century church father. Twentieth-century Reformed theologian B. B. Warfield said, "The system of doctrine taught by Calvin is just the Augustinianism common to the whole body of the Reformers." Paul Helm, a well-known Reformed theologian, used the term Augustinian Calvinism for his view in the book "The Augustinian-Calvinist View" in Divine Foreknowledge: Four Views.

Introduction 
John Calvin wrote, "Augustine is so wholly within me, that if I wished to write a confession of my faith, I could do so with all fullness and satisfaction to myself out of his writings." "This is why one finds that every four pages written in the Institutes of the Christian Religion John Calvin quoted Augustine. Calvin, for this reason, would deem himself not a Calvinist, but an Augustinian. [...] Christian Calvinist, should they be more likely deemed an Augustinian-Calvinist?" Cary concurs, writing, "As a result, Calvinism in particular is sometimes referred to as Augustinianism."

The theology of Calvinism has been immortalized in the acronym TULIP, which states the five essential doctrines of total depravity, unconditional election, limited atonement, irresistible grace, and perseverance of the saints. These were detailed after Calvin's death in the Second Synod of Dort in 1618–1619 against the opposing Five Articles of Remonstrance which followed the theology of Jacobus Arminius. Modern Reformed theology continues to assert these five points of Calvinism, as a simple summary of the soteriological doctrines which Calvin espoused and credited to Augustine.

Origin of the five points 
Augustine taught variants of these five points of Augustinian Calvinism the last eighteen years of his life. Previously he had taught traditional Christian views defending humanity's free choice to believe against the deterministic Manichaeans, to which he had belonged for a decade before converting to Christianity. In this Gnostic group, a non-relational God unilaterally chose the elect for salvation and the non-elect for damnation based upon his own desires. Early church fathers prior to Augustine refuted non-choice predeterminism as being pagan. Out of the fifty early Christian authors who wrote on the debate between free will and determinism, all fifty supported Christian free will against Stoic, Gnostic, and Manichean determinism and even Augustine taught traditional Christian theology against this determinism for twenty-six years prior to 412 CE. When Augustine started fighting the Pelagians he aligned his view with the Gnostic and Manichaean view and taught that humankind has no free will to believe until God infuses grace, which in turn results in saving faith. Augustine himself argued against Manichaean influence in his book against Pelagianism, where he was accused of Manichaeanism by Pelagians.

Total depravity and unconditional election in infant baptism 
The controversy over infant baptism with the Pelagians was a major reason for Augustine's change. Tertullian (ca. 200) was the first Christian to mention infant baptism. He refuted it by saying children should not be baptized until they can personally believe in Christ. Even by 400 CE there was no consensus regarding why infants should be baptized. The Pelagians taught infant baptism merely allowed children to enter the kingdom of God (viewed as different than heaven), so that unbaptized infants could still be in heaven. In response, Augustine invented the concept that infants are baptized to remove Adam's original guilt (guilt resulting in eternal damnation). Inherited original sin was previously limited to physical death, moral weakness, and a sin propensity.

Another key element within infant baptism was Augustine's early training in Stoicism, an ancient philosophy in which a meticulous micromanaging god predetermines every detailed event in the universe. This included the falling of a leaf from a tree to its exact location on the ground and the subtle movements of muscles in roosters' necks as they fight, which he explained in his first work, De providentia (On Providence). Augustine taught that God foreordained (or predestined) newborn babies who were baptized by actively helping or causing the parents to reach the bishop for baptism while the baby lived. By baptism, these babies would be saved from damnation. Augustine reasoned further that God actively blocked the parents of other infants from reaching the baptismal waters before their baby died. These babies were condemned to hell due to lack of baptism (according to Augustine). His view remains controversial, even some Roman Catholic Augustinian scholars refute this idea, and scholars cite the view's origin as derived as from Platonism, Stoicism, and Manichaeism.

Augustine then expanded this concept from infants to adults. Since babies have no "will" to desire their baptisms, Augustine expanded the implication to all humans. He concluded that God must predestine all humans prior to them making any choice. Although earlier Christians taught original sin, the concept of total depravity (total inability to believe on Christ) was borrowed from Gnostic Manichaeism. Manichaeism taught unborn babies and unbaptized infants were damned to hell because of a physical body. Like the Gnostics, the Manichaean god had to resurrect the dead will by infusing faith and grace. Augustine changed the cause of total depravity to Adam's guilt but kept the Stoic, Manichaean, and Neoplatonic concepts of the human dead will requiring god's infused grace and faith to respond.

Limited atonement 
Augustine attempted numerous explanations of 1 Timothy 2:4. The Pelagians assumed 1 Tim 2:4 taught that God gave the gift of faith to all persons, which Augustine easily refuted by changing wills/desires to "provides opportunity" (De spiritu et littera 37–38). In 414 CE Augustine's new theology has "all kinds/classes" definitively replacing "all" as absolute (ep. 149) and in 417 CE, Sermon 304.2 repeats this change of "all" to "all kinds". But only in AD 421 (Contra Julianum 4.8.42) did Augustine alter the text to read “all who are saved” meaning those who are saved are only saved by God's will, which he repeats the next year (Enchiridion 97, 103). People fail to be saved, “not because they do not will it, but because God does not” (Epistle 217.19). Despite their certain damnation, God makes other Christians desire their impossible salvation (De correptione et gratia 15, 47). Rist identifies as “the most pathetic passage.” By AD 429, Augustine quotes 1 Cor. 1.18 adding “such” to 1 Tim. 2:4, redefines all to mean as “all those elected,” and implies an irresistible calling. Hwang noted,

Augustine attempted at least five answers over a decade of time trying to explain 1 Tim. 2:4 regarding the extent of Christ's redeeming sacrifice. His major premise was the pagan idea that God receives everything he desires. Omnipotence (Stoic and Neoplatonic) is doing whatever the One desires, ensuring everything that occurs in the universe is exactly the Almighty's will and so must come to pass (Sermon 214.4). He concluded that because God gets everything he wants, God does not desire all persons to be saved, otherwise every human would be saved. Chadwick concluded that because Augustine's God does not desire and so refuses to save all persons, Augustine elevated God's sovereignty as absolute and God's justice was trampled. This also logically demanded that Christ could not have died for those who would not be saved. Therefore, Christ only died for the elect since God does not waste causation or energy.

Irresistible grace 
Augustine did not use the term irresistible grace, but wrote of God placing persons in circumstances God knew would cause them to make a certain choice or act a certain way.

Perseverance of the Saints 
One of his last works specifically addresses the Gift of Perseverance. In this work Augustine notes that persons cannot know whether or not they have received that gift from God. Since Augustine accepted the doctrine that the Holy Spirit is received at water baptism producing regeneration (salvation), he had to explain why some regenerated babies continued in the faith while other baptized infants would fall away from the faith and even live immoral lives in debauchery. Both groups possessed the Holy Spirit, so how can one account for the difference? Augustine concluded that God must give a second gift of grace called perseverance. The gift of perseverance is only given to some baptized infants. Without this second gift of grace a baptized Christian with the Holy Spirit will not persevere and ultimately will not be saved.

Double predestination 
Double predestination, or the double decree, is the doctrine that God actively reprobates, or decrees damnation of some persons, as well as salvation for those whom he has elected. After 411 CE, Augustine made statements that teach this doctrine (e.g., Enchir. 100, De nat. orig. 1.14, 4.16, Serm.229S, Serm.260D.1, De civ. dei 14.26, 15.1, ep.204.2), but persons relying primarily on Augustine's writings prior to 412 CE are not clear whether he held to double predestination. In ep.225 (from Prosper) and ep.226 (from Hilary of Gaul), both men complained that fellow Christians did not want Augustine's dangerous new view of predestination and perseverance preached because it rejected the traditional view of election based upon God’s foreknowledge, replacing it with a ‘predestination’ as “necessity based upon fate” (ep.225.3). Hilary complained, “But they do not want this perseverance to be preached if it means that it can neither be merited by prayer not lost by rebellion” (ep.226.4; cf. Persev.10). Persons who later taught that same double predestination they found within Augustine's writings, such as Gottschalk of Orbais and the Jansenists, were condemned by the church. 

During the Protestant Reformation, John Calvin also held double predestinarian views. John Calvin states: "By predestination we mean the eternal decree of God, by which he determined with himself whatever he wished to happen with regard to every man. All are not created on equal terms, but some are preordained to eternal life, others to eternal damnation; and, accordingly, as each has been created for one or other of these ends, we say that he has been predestinated to life or to death."

References

Sources
 
 

Calvinist theology
Augustine of Hippo